The 1993–94 season was Manchester United's second season in the Premier League, and their 19th consecutive season in the top division of English football. Manchester United won the Premier League and FA Cup to become only the fourth club in the 20th century to win the Double. Only a 3–1 defeat to Aston Villa in the League Cup Final prevented them from winning a domestic treble.

They led the Premier League table from the fourth game onwards, and ended up winning the league by eight points over nearest rivals Blackburn Rovers, although their lead of the table had peaked at 16 points halfway through the season. French striker Eric Cantona scored 25 goals in all competitions and was voted PFA Player of the Year. Ryan Giggs, Lee Sharpe and Andrei Kanchelskis also hit the headlines with their brilliant form. In the FA Cup Final, United crushed Chelsea 4–0 thanks to two penalties from Eric Cantona and a goal each from Mark Hughes and Brian McClair.

Roy Keane justified his tag as the most expensive footballer in England by establishing himself as the club's regular central midfielder alongside Paul Ince, while veterans Mark Hughes, Brian McClair and Steve Bruce continued to excel despite their advancing years. The end of the season saw the club's longest serving player and joint captain, Bryan Robson, quit Old Trafford after 13 years to become Middlesbrough's player-manager. Also heading out of the exit door at the end of the season were Les Sealey, Clayton Blackmore, Mike Phelan, Colin McKee, and Giuliano Maiorana. Dion Dublin, who was unable to reclaim a regular place in the first team, was linked with a move away from Old Trafford for much of the season, but a move to Everton in November fell through and he was still at the club when the season ended.

With United's squad arguably the finest in England, Ferguson's only close-season signing was David May from Blackburn Rovers. May, 24, was signed by Ferguson in hope that he would develop into an eventual long-term successor to Steve Bruce. United also had plenty of strength in depth with promising teenagers David Beckham, Nicky Butt, Gary Neville and Paul Scholes on the verge of making a breakthrough.

Pre-season and friendlies

FA Charity Shield

FA Premier League

FA Cup

League Cup

UEFA Champions League

Squad statistics

Events of the season

The 1992–93 season saw United end their 26-year wait for the league title, fighting off competition from Aston Villa (managed by former United boss Ron Atkinson) and surprise title contenders Norwich City to seal the title by a 10-point margin. 

Almost as soon as the season was over, United were reported to be in the hunt for 21-year-old Nottingham Forest and Republic of Ireland midfielder Roy Keane. After weeks of speculation and fighting it out with Arsenal and Blackburn Rovers, Keane joined United for a national record fee of £3.75 million on 19 July.

His debut came on 7 August in the FA Charity Shield against Arsenal at Wembley Stadium, in which Mark Hughes put United ahead before Ian Wright equalised for the Gunners and forced extra time then penalties. United won the shoot-out to add the shield to their trophy cabinet.

A week later, their defence of the Premier League title began with a 2–0 win at Carrow Road over Norwich City, followed three days later by a 3–0 home win over Sheffield United in which Roy Keane scored his first United goal.

United then defeated Aston Villa 2–1 at Villa Park on 23 August to go top of the league ahead of Everton in which Lee Sharpe scored twice. United would not be headed in the league all season from this point.

15 September 1993 saw United play in their first European Cup tie for 25 years. They travelled to Hungary for a first round tie with Kispest Honvéd, and came away 3–2 winners with two goals from Roy Keane and the other from Eric Cantona.

A week later, United travelled to Stoke City (managed by former United forward Lou Macari) in the Football League Cup second round first leg at the Victoria Ground, but suffered a 2–1 defeat in which Dion Dublin scored United's only goal – his first goal since returning from a leg injury suffered 12 months earlier.

At the end of the month, Manchester United progressed to the second round of the European Cup by winning the return leg against Honvéd 2–1 at Old Trafford, with Steve Bruce scoring both goals.

The return leg against Stoke in the League Cup saw United win 2–0 at Old Trafford and earn a place in the third round.

October saw the next stage of the European Cup, where United drew 3–3 at home to Galatasaray in the second round first leg after taking a 2–0 lead.

On 3 November, Manchester United went out of the European Cup on away goals after drawing 0–0 with Galatasaray in Istanbul. By this stage, however, they were maintaining a runaway lead in the league, standing 11 points clear at the top of the table. Their excellent form continued into November, which they began with a remarkable 3–2 derby win over Manchester City at Maine Road after being 2–0 down. 

With United still way ahead at the top of the league, December began with a visit to Old Trafford by one of their nearest rivals hoping to topple them. Norwich City came away with a point after holding United to a 2–2 draw, but the real challenge came on Boxing Day when Blackburn Rovers very nearly took all three points and only an equaliser by Paul Ince saved United from defeat and preserved their 16-point lead.

The first game of 1994 was an uneventful goalless draw at home to Leeds United, followed three days later by a dramatic 3–3 draw against Liverpool at Anfield after United had taken a 3–0 lead. Then came a 1–0 away win over Sheffield United in the FA Cup third round, in which Mark Hughes scored the only goal of the game before being sent off. 

Old Trafford was turned into a shrine on 20 January 1994 when Sir Matt Busby, who had served the club for almost 50 years as a manager, director and club president, died at the age of 84. Within 48 hours of his death, United took on Everton at Old Trafford in the league and the examplary behaviour of Everton fans during the minutes silence before kick-off was followed by a fitting game in which United won 1–0, with Ryan Giggs scoring the only goal of the game. United were still looking uncatchable as leaders. Before the month was over, United dispatched of Norwich City in the FA Cup fourth round.

February was a quiet month for league action, the only games being a 3–2 away win over QPR and a 2–2 draw at West Ham United. Another visit to London came in the FA Cup fifth round, which United won 3–0 over Wimbledon at Selhurst Park. 

United were still going in the League Cup, and ended February with a comprehensive victory over Sheffield Wednesday in the League Cup semi-finals to book their second Wembley final in three seasons. 

However, March was a precarious month for United, whose treble challenge appeared to be on the rocks and fans were left wondering whether the team might end the season with nothing. 

The month began with a 1–0 home defeat by Chelsea in the league – only their second of the season. Then they took on Charlton Athletic in the FA Cup quarter-final at Old Trafford, winning 3–1 but having goalkeeper Peter Schmeichel sent off, ruling him out of the League Cup final. A comprehensive 5–0 league win over Sheffield Wednesday stemmed fears that their title role would be seized by Blackburn Rovers, but 2–2 away draws with Swindon Town and then Arsenal cost them four valuable points and fears over the title challenge were further heightened by the fact that Eric Cantona was sent off in both of these games, earning himself a five-match ban.

The treble dream ended at Wembley on 27 March, where United were beaten 3–1 by Ron Atkinson's Aston Villa. The following weekend, their lead at the top of the table was cut down to goal difference by Blackburn Rovers, whose striker Alan Shearer scored both of the goals as Kenny Dalglish's team were looking as though they might make a late run to their first top division title since 1914.

Two days after the defeat at Ewood Park came the visit of relegation threatened Oldham Athletic to Old Trafford. With Eric Cantona still suspended, Dion Dublin took the advantage of a rare first team start and opened up the scoring in a pulsating 3–2 win which extended United's lead of the title race. Six days later, United and Oldham met again at Wembley for the FA Cup semi-final. This game was relatively disappointing, and when Oldham's Neil Pointon put the underdogs ahead it looked as though the biggest FA Cup upset in years was in the making. However, with only a minute to go, Mark Hughes scored a spectacular late equaliser to force a replay at Maine Road three days later, which United won 4–1. This game was memorable for being the one where Bryan Robson scored the last of his 97 goals in 13 years at the club before departing to Middlesbrough at the end of the season as player-manager of the Teesside club.

In the league, meanwhile, there was another scare on 16 April as United lost 1–0 at Wimbledon, but luckily they were still ahead of a Blackburn side who had endured a setback of their own. Subsequent wins over Leeds United and Manchester City meant that United ended the month just one win away from championship glory with three games remaining.

The visit to struggling Ipswich Town on Portman Road on 1 May 1994 came on a day when the sporting world was overshadowed with the death of racing driver Ayrton Senna in the San Marino Grand Prix, but the football world was focused on United's attempts to seal a second successive league title. It was a narrow 2–1 victory for United, with goals from Eric Cantona and Ryan Giggs, but enough to seal the title. 

On 14 May 1994, United took to the pitch at Wembley with only Chelsea standing in their way of their first double. Before the game, however, Alex Ferguson had made one of the hardest decision of his managerial career – omitting Bryan Robson from the squad of 14.

United were firm favourites to win but were taking nothing for granted, not least due to the fact that Chelsea were the only side to have beaten them twice in the league that season and the only side to have beaten them at Old Trafford in a competitive game. For half of the game it was touch and go as the half time whistle blew and the deadlock had yet to be broken. However, United were awarded two penalties in quick succession, with Eric Cantona converting them both to secure a 2–0 lead. Any hopes of Chelsea overturning that lead were effectively ended when Mark Hughes put United 3–0 up, and a late goal from substitute Brian McClair gave United a 4–0 win and a place in the history books.

Bryan Robson was not the only player to exit Old Trafford in the 1994 close season. Fellow veterans Les Sealey, Mike Phelan and Clayton Blackmore were released on free transfers, young midfielder Craig Lawton was transferred to Port Vale and Giuliano Maiorana, the forgotten winger who hadn't been selected for the first team since being injured in the 1989–90 season, was finally given a free transfer. During the season, Danny Wallace had called time on four injury plagued years at United (the last two of which had barely brought any first team action) and signed for Birmingham City in a £250,000 deal in October 1993, while 1990 FA Cup final hero Lee Martin put an end to a similarly long period in the shadows and joining Lou Macari's Celtic for the same fee.

The 1994 close season saw two arrivals at Old Trafford. David May, the young Blackburn Rovers defender, was signed for £1.2 million as Alex Ferguson saw him as a potential long-term replacement for the ageing Steve Bruce, who had just agreed to remain at the club for another three seasons. Blackburn, attempting to make it third time lucky in their bid to beat United to the Premier League title, broke the national record fee that summer by paying Norwich City £5 million for striker Chris Sutton, who like Alan Shearer two summers earlier had been linked to Old Trafford before heading to Ewood Park instead. Blackburn were by no means the only side tipped to challenge United's dominance of the Premier League for its third season, as the likes of Arsenal, Liverpool and Newcastle United spent heavily on new players that summer. 

United's other summer signing was 18-year-old Bradford City striker Graeme Tomlinson, who had impressed after six goals in 17 games for the Division Two club and cost United a £500,000 fee as Ferguson took the unusual step of looking elsewhere for squad depth in the shape of younger players.

There was also talk that winger Andrei Kanchelskis would be on his way out of the club, but this was quickly silenced when the player put pen to paper in a new contract that would keep him at Old Trafford until the end of the 1998–99 season.

References

Manchester United F.C. seasons
Manchester United
1994